Sergei Krylov may refer to:
Sergei Krylov (violinist) (born 1970), Russian violinist
Presence (Marvel Comics), a fictional character in the Marvel Comics Universe with the real name Sergei Krylov
Sergei Krylov (judge), Soviet diplomat and ICJ judge
Sergey Krylov (racing driver) (born 1963), Russian auto racing driver
Sergei Krylov (singer), Russian singer